Great Bridge South railway station was the only station on a link line between the South Staffordshire Line and the Birmingham Snow Hill-Wolverhampton Low Level Line. It was opened in 1866. As with many passenger stations, it closed during the years of the First World War but reopened in 1920 and remained operational until British Rail closed the station through the Beeching Axe in 1964.

Despite another station existing in Great Bridge from 1866, the station was not given the name of South until after nationalisation in 1950.

The station site is now a housing estate while much of the railway alignment was reused for the Black Country Spine Road.

References

Disused railway stations in Sandwell
Railway stations in Great Britain opened in 1866
Railway stations in Great Britain closed in 1964
Beeching closures in England
1866 establishments in England
Former Great Western Railway stations